PRN may refer to:

Airports 
 PRN, the IATA airport code for Pristina International Airport Adem Jashari, Pristina, Kosovo
 PRN, the FAA LID code for Mac Crenshaw Memorial Airport, Greenville, Alabama, United States

Medicine 
 Pertactin, a highly immunogenic virulence factor of a bacterium
 Pro re nata, a Latin phrase meaning "in the circumstances" or "as the circumstance arises"

Politics
 Christian Labour Party, previously Partido da Reconstrução Nacional, a Brazilian political party
 Nicaraguan Resistance Party, a party founded by the Nicaraguan Contras
 Partido Nacional Revolucionario (Party of the Mexican Revolution), Mexico, predecessor of the Institutional Revolutionary Party (Partido Revolucionario Institucional, PRI)

Publications 
 Pacific RailNews, a defunct American rail-enthusiast magazine
 PRN Forum, a predecessor of Journal of Pain and Symptom Management

Radio 
 Performance Racing Network, an American radio network that broadcasts NASCAR automobile races
 Premiere Radio Networks, an American radio network

Other uses 
 Packaging Recovery Note, documenting packaging recycling
 Paralympic route network, linking Paralympic games venues
 Parton railway station, in Cumbria, England
 Premier Retail Networks
 PRN:, name of DOS printer device
 Pseudorandom noise
 Praseodymium nitride, a chemical with the formula PrN.